John Woodford may refer to:

John Woodford (Australian cricketer) (1881–1949), Australian cricketer
John Woodford (English cricketer) (born 1943), English cricketer
John George Woodford (1785–1879), British Army officer
Jack Woodford (1894–1971), American writer
John Woodford (MP) for Tamworth

See also
John Woodforde (c. 1808–1866), a medical professional and one of the earliest settlers to the British colony of South Australia